Jaafar Jaafar is a Nigerian journalist from Kano state and the founder of Daily Nigerian, an online publication company which published a controversial video clip showing a Kano State Governor, Abdullahi Umar Ganduje receiving $5 million bribe in October 2018.

Early life and education
Jaafar was born on 12 March 1978 in Fagge Local Government Area of Kano State. Jaafar holds a Master's Degree in Communication Studies (Bayero University, Kano) Bachelor's Degree in Mass Communication (Bayero University Kano), a diploma in Public Relations Strategy (London School of Public Relations).

Journalism
He started his journalism career at Daily Trust newspapers in 2007 and left the newsroom after his appointment as Special Assistant on Media and Public Relations to Kano State Governor Rabiu Kwankwaso between 2011 and 2015.

He joined Premium Times as Assistant Editor in 2015 and left a year after to establish Daily Nigerian, one of the fastest growing online publications in Nigeria. He was a one time columnist with Peoples Daily, Blueprint and Nigerian Tribune newspapers.

In October 2018 Jaafar published number of video clips showing Kano State Governor, Abdullahi Umar Ganduje receiving $5 million bribe, although the governor denied the allegation. and also drag Jaafar to court. Jaafar was invited by Kano State House of Assembly to prove that the video clip was real which attracted the attention of Nigerians whether the House can be able to impeached the governor which they couldn't.

Jaafar endanger himself by releasing the video clip according to him on BBC Hausa Radio News. an article was written on Amnesty International website.

Senator Ibrahim Abdullahi Danbaba seeks Nigerian Senate intervention on allege character assassination by Jaafar according to the Senator.

References 

1978 births
21st-century journalists
Living people
Nigerian journalists
Bayero University Kano alumni
People from Kano State
Nigerian Muslims
Hausa people
Nigerian writers
Nigerian editors
Hausa-language writers